El Bayyada is a town in the Jebel Akhdar region of Libya.

El Bayyada was founded in 1938, under the Italian rule, as one of the rural villages which had to be populated by Italian colonists. It was named Villaggio D'Annunzio after the well-known Italian poet Gabriele d'Annunzio, and was designed by Italian architect Florestano Di Fausto.

References

External links
 Libya as it was and as it will be 

Populated places in Marj District